Richard J. Voris (January 25, 1922 – December 26, 2008) was an American football player and coach. He served as head football coach at the University of Virginia from 1958 to 1960, compiling a record of 1–29.

Early life 
He graduated from Santa Cruz High School in 1940, where he was on the varsity football team as well as a member of the golf team and track and field. Voris graduated from Salinas Junior College (later Hartnell) in 1942.

Coaching career
Voris was named head coach of the Virginia Cavaliers football program on February 11, 1958. In his three seasons at the helm, the Cavaliers went 1–29. That mark included a 28-game losing streak, then an NCAA major-college record. His only win came against Duke with a score of 15–12. He resigned shortly after the conclusion of the 1960 season, on December 9.

Following his stint at Virginia, Voris was hired by the Green Bay Packers of the NFL. From 1961 to 1962, he served as the teams director of player personnel and also as an assistant on Vince Lombardi's staff, coaching the ends. During that period the Packers won two league championships.

He was also an assistant coach with the San Francisco 49ers and at San Jose State.

After coaching James Lick High School to a championship, he brought nine players from the San Jose area and two from his previous coaching job in Hanford to join Salinas Valley area players.

In his two seasons at Hartnell, his teams compiled a 20–0–1 record.

Head coaching record

College

References

1922 births
2008 deaths
American football centers
Army Black Knights football coaches
Baltimore Colts coaches
Detroit Lions coaches
Green Bay Packers coaches
Green Bay Packers executives
Los Angeles Rams coaches
New York Jets coaches
St. Louis Cardinals (football) coaches
San Francisco 49ers coaches
San Jose State Spartans football coaches
San Jose State Spartans football players
Tampa Bay Buccaneers coaches
Virginia Cavaliers football coaches
National Football League defensive coordinators
High school football coaches in California
Junior college football coaches in the United States
Sportspeople from Los Angeles
Santa Cruz High School alumni
Hartnell College alumni
Players of American football from Los Angeles
Sports coaches from Los Angeles